Batani may refer to:
 Bățani, a commune in Romania
 Bettani, a Pashtun tribe in Afghanistan and Pakistan
 Al-Battānī, a Muslim scientist during the Islamic Golden Age